Shenandoah is the debut studio album by the American country music band of the same name. Released in 1987 on Columbia Records, it includes three singles: "They Don't Make Love Like We Used To" and "Stop the Rain." "Stop the Rain" was the band's first Top 40 country hit, peaking at #28 on Billboard Hot Country Singles (now Hot Country Songs). "She Doesn't Cry Anymore" carried over to the band's 1989 album The Road Not Taken, being released as a single from it.

Track listing

Personnel

Shenandoah
Ralph Ezell - bass guitar
Mike McGuire - percussion, background vocals
Marty Raybon - lead vocals
Jim Seales - electric guitar, background vocals
Stan Thorn - keyboards

Additional Musicians
Walt Aldridge - electric guitar, background vocals
Kenny Bell - acoustic guitar
Robert Byrne - acoustic guitar, percussion, background vocals
Duncan Cameron - steel guitar, dobro
Chalmers Davis - keyboards
Paul Franklin - dobro
Owen Hale - drums
Rick Hall - background vocals
Steve Jones - background vocals
Mac McAnally - acoustic guitar
Kenny Mims - electric guitar
Steve Nathan - keyboards
Jack Peck - trumpet

References
[ Shenandoah] at Allmusic

1987 debut albums
Columbia Records albums
Shenandoah (band) albums
Albums produced by Robert Byrne (songwriter)